Luis Sangel Arráez (born April 9, 1997) is a Venezuelan professional baseball second baseman for the Miami Marlins of Major League Baseball (MLB). Arráez signed with the Minnesota Twins as an international free agent in 2013, and made his MLB debut with them in 2019. In 2022, Arráez was an All-Star and won the American League batting title and a Silver Slugger Award. In the 2022–2023 offseason, the Twins traded him to the Marlins.

Career

Minor leagues
Arráez signed with the Minnesota Twins as an international free agent in November 2013. He made his professional debut in 2014 with the Dominican Summer League Twins, hitting .348/.433/.400 with 15 RBIs. He played for the GCL Twins in 2015, hitting .306/.377/.388 with 19 RBIs, and was an FCL post-season All Star, and an MiLB.com Organization All-Star. In 2016, he played for the Cedar Rapids Kernels, hitting .347(2nd in the Midwest League)/.386/.444 with 67 runs (8th), 31 doubles (9th), 3 home runs and 66 RBIs, and was a Midwest League mid-season and post-season All Star, and an MiLB.com Organization All-Star.

Arráez played in only three games for the Fort Myers Miracle in 2017 due to a torn ACL.  He returned from the injury in 2018, playing for Fort Myers and the Chattanooga Lookouts, hitting a combined .310/.361/.397 with 3 home runs and 36 RBIs. The Twins added him to their 40-man roster after the 2018 season.

Arráez opened the 2019 season with the Pensacola Blue Wahoos, hitting .342/.415/.397 with 14 RBIs in 38 games.  He was promoted to the Rochester Red Wings on May 14, 2019.

Minnesota Twins

2019–2021
On May 17, 2019, the Twins called Arráez up to the major leagues for the first time. He made his major league debut on May 18 versus the Seattle Mariners. and got a double, his first career hit, off Mariners pitcher Cory Gearrin. Arráez hit his first major league home run on May 21 against the Los Angeles Angels. 

He finished the 2019 season hitting .334 in 326 at bats over 92 games with 36 walks and 29 strikeouts, and placed sixth in American League (AL) Rookie of the Year voting. He led the AL in percentage of balls hit to the opposite field, at 36.7%.

In 2020, Arráez hit .321/.364/.402 with 13 RBIs in 112 at bats over 32 games.

In 2021, he batted .294/.357/.376 in 428 at bats, with 6 triples (4th in the American League).

2022
Arráez reached base five times on June 5, 2022, including four hits and one walk, in an 8–6 win over the Toronto Blue Jays.  On June 9, the trio of Arráez, Byron Buxton, and Carlos Correa each hit consecutive home runs off Gerrit Cole to open the bottom of the first inning versus the New York Yankees.  On June 11, Arráez connected for his first major league grand slam, versus Shane Baz of the Tampa Bay Rays.

On July 10, 2022, Arráez was elected to his first career MLB All Star Game as a reserve for the American League. 

In 2022, he batted .316 (leading the American League)/.375(7th)/.420 with 50 walks and 43 strikeouts in 547 at bats, leading the AL in at bats per strikeout (12.7). He struck out in 7.1% of his plate appearances, the lowest percentage of all major league batters in 2022. He had the highest contact percentage with all pitches thrown to him of any major leaguer at 94.1%, when swinging at pitches outside the strike zone he made contact 91.1% of the time, tops in the major leagues, and with pitchers in the strike zone he made contact with 96.0% of all pitches he swung at, again tops in the majors. He played 65 games at first base, 41 at second base, 38 at DH, and 7 at third base.  Arráez
was named winner of the Luis Aparicio Award for the first time in his career, along with José Altuve of the Houston Astros, as the year's best Venezuelan players in Major League Baseball.

Miami Marlins
On January 20, 2023, the Twins traded Arráez to the Miami Marlins for Pablo López, José Salas, and Byron Chourio. Arráez's $6.1 million salary for the 2023 season was set by the arbitration process.

See also

 List of Major League Baseball players from Venezuela

References

External links

Living people
1997 births
Major League Baseball players from Venezuela
Major League Baseball infielders
Minnesota Twins players
American League All-Stars
American League batting champions
Silver Slugger Award winners
Luis Aparicio Award winners
Dominican Summer League Twins players
Venezuelan expatriate baseball players in the Dominican Republic
Gulf Coast Twins players
Cedar Rapids Kernels players
Fort Myers Miracle players
Chattanooga Lookouts players
Pensacola Blue Wahoos players
Rochester Red Wings players
Navegantes del Magallanes players
St. Paul Saints players
Venezuelan expatriate baseball players in the United States
People from San Felipe, Venezuela
2023 World Baseball Classic players